Bobovje is a village near Krapina, in Krapina-Zagorje County, Croatia.

References

Populated places in Krapina-Zagorje County